Ariel Olascoaga Gutiérrez (born 26 August 1929 in Treinta y Tres, Uruguay; died 22 August 2010) was an Uruguayan basketball player who competed in the 1956 Summer Olympics.

References

External links

1929 births
2010 deaths
Uruguayan men's basketball players
Olympic basketball players of Uruguay
Basketball players at the 1956 Summer Olympics
Olympic bronze medalists for Uruguay
Olympic medalists in basketball
Medalists at the 1956 Summer Olympics
People from Treinta y Tres
Place of death missing